Čiurlionis was a  Lithuanian painter, composer and writer

Čiurlionis may also refer to:
Čiurlionis (surname)
Asteroid 2420 Čiurlionis
National M. K. Čiurlionis School of Art,  Vilnius, Lithuania
M. K. Čiurlionis National Art Museum,  Kaunas, Lithuania
M. K. Čiurlionis Bridge,  Kaunas, Lithuania
Čiurlionis Mountain, Hooker Island, Franz Josef Land, Russia